Siegfried Ochs (19 April 1858 – 6 February 1929) was a German choral conductor and composer.

Life
Born in Frankfurt, Ochs first studied medicine and chemistry at the Polytechnikum Darmstadt (today the Technische Universität Darmstadt) and at the Ruprecht Karl University of Heidelberg. He later devoted himself entirely to music, studying at the Königliche Hochschule für Musik, Berlin, under Schultze and Ernst Rudorff, and later privately under Friedrich Kiel and Heinrich Urban. In 1882 Ochs founded the Philharmonic Choral Society of Berlin, which he would lead until 1920. At first an obscure organization, it became prominent through numerous performances given by Hans von Bülow, an intimate friend of Ochs. It arguably became the greatest choral society in Berlin and was distinguished for its helpful patronage of young musicians, whose compositions were performed for the first time.

Ochs died in Berlin.

Works
Ochs was noted for humorous or parodic compositions. He wrote both the libretto and music of the three-act comic opera Im Namen des Gesetzes (Hamburg, 1888), two operettas, duets for soprano and alto, male choruses, vocal canons, and several books of songs. Many musicologists also maintain that Ochs was both composer and lyricist of the aria Dank sei Dir, Herr, still widely believed to be by Handel.

References

Attribution

External links
 
 
 Guide to the Siegfried Ochs Collection at the Leo Baeck Institute, New York.
 

1858 births
1929 deaths
19th-century classical composers
19th-century conductors (music)
20th-century classical composers
20th-century German conductors (music)
20th-century German male musicians
Bach conductors
German choral conductors
German male classical composers
German male conductors (music)
German Romantic composers